Antoine Bret (9 July 1717, Dijon – 25 February 1792, Paris aged 74) was an 18th-century French writer and playwright.

A prolific writer, he practiced almost all genres. He composed light poetry, comedies, novels, memoirs, parodic and licentious tales. A fairly pure style, ease of invention, reviews more ingenious than deep made him a reputation without rising above the fair. A good connoisseur of drama, he wrote plays sinning nevertheless by lack verve and comic force.

We owe him an edition of the Oeuvres by Molière, whose comments were appreciated. La Belle Alsacienne, ou Telle mère telle fille, a libertine novel first published in 1745 under the title La Belle Allemande, ou les Galanteries de Thérèse, which tells the story of a girl walking in the footsteps of her mother and letting her drive by in the ways of gallantry, was assigned to him as well as to Claude Villaret.
 
Antoine Bret was a member of the Académie de Stanislas in Nancy and Académie des Sciences, Arts et Belles-Lettres de Dijon. During several years, he contributed the Gazette de France and Journal encyclopédique and was also royal censor for operas.

Publications 
1743: Cythéride, histoire galante traduite du grec
1745: La Belle Allemande, ou les Galanteries de Thérèse, also known under the title La Belle Alsacienne, ou Telle mère telle fille and also attributed to Claude Villaret, Text online
1746: Lycoris, ou la Courtisane grecque
1749: Le *****, histoire bavarde, Text online
1751: Memoires sur la vie de mademoiselle de Lenclos, Text online
1765: Essai de contes moraux et dramatiques
1770: Essai d'une Poétique à la mode.
Theatre
1744: Le Déguisement pastoral, one-act opéra comique, Paris, Théâtre de la foire Saint-Laurent, 27 July
1744: Le Quartier d'hiver, comedy in 1 act and in verse, with Claude Villaret and Claude Godard d'Aucour, Paris, Théâtre-Français, 4 December
1747: L'École amoureuse, one-act comedy, in verse, Paris, Théâtre-Français, 11 September
1747: Le Concert, comedy in 1 act and in prose, Paris, Théâtre-Français, 16 November
1750: La Double Extravagance, comedy in 3 acts and in verse, Paris, Théâtre-Français, 27 July
1753: Le Parnasse moderne, one-act opéra comique, Paris, Théâtre de la foire Saint-Germain, 3 February
1753: Le Calendrier des vieillards, one-act opéra comique, Paris, Théâtre de la foire Saint-Germain, 7 April
1755: Le Jaloux, comedy in 3 acts and in verse, Paris, Théâtre-Français, 15 May
1758: L'Orpheline, ou le Faux généreux, comedy in 3 acts and in verse, Paris, Théâtre-Français, 18 January
1763: Le Protecteur bourgeois, ou la Confiance trahie, comedy in five acts and in verse, 13 October, Text online
1764: L'Épreuve indiscrète, two-act comedy in verse, Paris, Théâtre-Français, 30 January
1765: Le Mariage par dépit, three-act comedy in prose, Paris, Théâtre-Français, 13 June
1778: Les Deux Julies, ou le Père crédule, three-act comédie-farce in free verse, imitated from the Bacchides by Plautus
1785: L'Hôtellerie, ou le Faux Ami, drama in 5 acts and in verse, Paris, Théâtre de l'Odéon, 30 September
undated: La Maison, comedy in two acts and in verse
undated: L'Humeur à l'épreuve, comedy in one act and in prose 
undated: Les Lettres anonymes, comedy in four acts and in verse.
Collected works
1772: Œuvres de M. Bret, Text online : 1. Fables orientales et poésies diverses 2. Le Protecteur bourgeois 3. Réflexions sur la littérature
1789: Œuvres de M. Bret, 2 vol., Text online : 1. L'École amoureuse. La Double Extravagance. Le Jaloux. L'Humeur à l'épreuve. Le Faux Généreux 2. La Maison. Le Protecteur bourgeois. Les Lettres anonymes. Les Deux Julies
Édition de Molière
1778: Œuvres complètes de Molière, avec des remarques grammaticales, des avertissements et des observations sur chaque pièce, 6 vol., 1773 ; 8 vol.

Sources 
 Gustave Vapereau, Dictionnaire universel des littératures, Paris, Hachette, 1876, (p. 324)
 Ferdinand Hoefer, Nouvelle Biographie générale, t. 7, Paris, Firmin-Didot, 1853, (p. 338)

External links 
  Antoine Bret on CÉSAR
 Antoine Bret on Data.bnf.fr

18th-century French writers
18th-century French male writers
18th-century French dramatists and playwrights
1717 births
Writers from Dijon
1792 deaths